Immunoglobulin kappa constant, also known as IGKC, is a human gene that encodes the constant domain of kappa-type light chains for antibodies. It is found on chromosome 2, in humans, within the Immunoglobulin kappa locus, IGK@.

References

Further reading

Proteins